Draba ramosissima, the branched draba, is a species of flowering plant in the family Brassicaceae. It has a restricted range, being found only on calcareous cliffs of the Appalachian Mountains, the Kentucky River Palisades, and Middle Tennessee.  It is a small perennial herb with racemes of white flowers in the spring.

References

ramosissima